Wataru is a masculine Japanese given name.

Possible writings
Wataru can be written using several kanji characters. Here are some examples: 

渉, "ford"
渡, "ferry over"
亘, "extend across"
航, "navigate"
和, "harmony"
亙, "extend across"
弥, "more and more"

The name can also be written in hiragana わたる or katakana ワタル.

Notable people with the name
, Japanese announcer, television personality, and news anchor
 Wataru Asō (麻生 渡, born 1939), governor of Fukuoka Prefecture in Japan
, Japanese footballer
 Wataru Fukuda (福田 亘, born 1964), Japanese actor
, Japanese footballer
 Wataru Hatano (羽多野 渉, born 1982), Japanese voice actor
 Wataru Hokoyama (鋒山 亘, born 1974), music composer
, Japanese professional wrestler
, Japanese footballer
 Wataru Ishijima (石島 渉, 1906–1980), paleontologist and geologist
 Wataru Ito (伊藤 渉, born 1969), Japanese politician
 Wataru Kamimura (上村 亘, born 1986), Japanese shogi player
 Wataru Kubo (久保 亘, 1929–2003), Japanese politician 
 Wataru Misaka (三阪 亙, 1923–2019), Japanese-American basketball player
 Wataru Miyawaki (宮脇 渉, born 1980), vocalist of Japanese rock band 12012
 Wataru Murayama (村山 渉), Japanese manga writer
, Japanese footballer
 Wataru Sakata (坂田 亘, born 1973), professional wrestler and martial arts fighter
, Japanese footballer
 Wataru Takagi (高木 渉,, born 1966), Japanese voice actor
 Wataru Takeishi (竹石 渉, born 1982), music video director
 Wataru Takeshita (竹下 亘, 1946–2021), Japanese politician
, Japanese footballer
, Japanese boxer
 Wataru Yamazaki (山崎 渡, born 1980), Japanese footballer
, Japanese shogi player
, Japanese hurdler
 Wataru Yoshikawa (吉川 和多留, born 1968), Japanese motorcycle rider
 Wataru Yoshizumi (吉住 渉, born 1963), Japanese manga artist

Fictional characters
 Wataru Ikusabe (戦部 ワタル)), a character from Mashin Hero Wataru
 Wataru Kurenai (紅 渡), main character from Kamen Rider Kiva
 Wataru Hoshi (ホシ・ワタル), the main character from Star Trigon
 Wataru Azuma (東 航), the main character from Tumbling
 Wataru Sanzu (三途 渡), a character from Inazuma Eleven
Wataru Onaga (尾長 渉), a character from the manga and anime Haikyu!! with the position of middle blocker from Fukurodani Academy
Wataru Kuon (久遠 渡,), a supporting character from the football manga Blue Lock 
Wataru Hibiya (日比谷 渉), a character from the dating sim video game Tokimeki Memorial Girl's Side

Japanese masculine given names